Radha Poonoosamy (Tamil: ராதா பொன்னுசாமி படையாச்சி) (née Padayachee, 18 September 1924 – January 2008), was a Mauritian politician, the country's first female cabinet minister, and a feminist activist.

She was born Radha Padayachee on 18 September 1924 in Durban, South Africa. She was born into a family of Indian ancestry.

She was educated at the University of Natal, where she was an "outspoken opponent of apartheid", and became a member of the Student Council of the Indian National Congress, which fought against anti-Indian discrimination in South Africa. She went on to become head of the women's section, and also a member of the executive committee of the African National Congress (ANC).

She married the physician Dr. Valaydon Poonoosamy, and they settled in Mauritius in 1952. She became a naturalized citizen, and continued her activism there within Mauritius's Labour Party.

In 1975, Poonoosamy was elected a Member of Parliament, becoming the country's first female minister, the inaugural minister in charge of the Ministry of Women's Affairs, and helped pass laws against sex discrimination.

References

1924 births
2008 deaths
Members of the National Assembly (Mauritius)
People from Durban
South African emigrants to Mauritius
University of Natal alumni
African National Congress politicians
Indian National Congress politicians
Labour Party (Mauritius) politicians
Mauritian Christians
Mauritian politicians of Indian descent
African feminists
Mauritian women in politics